Grzegorz Sandomierski (born 5 September 1989) is a Polish professional footballer who plays as a goalkeeper. At international level, Sandomierski has represented the Poland senior team at UEFA Euro 2012.

Club career

Jagiellonia Bialystok
Sandomierski's career began at Jagiellonia Białystok, starting in the reserve side from 2006. He played in four games and then was loaned out to Lech Poznań. He made two appearances in the third division, after which he returned to Jagiellonia. In the 2007–08 season, due to an injury to Jacek Banaszyński, Sandomierski made his début in a first league match with Cracovia in which he conceded two goals. By the end of the competition, he appeared in four other matches. Sandomierski then sustained a serious injury which excluded him from the game for half a year. In January 2009 he was loaned to Ruch Wysokie Mazowieckie, where he played as first choice goalkeeper. Prior to the 2009–10 season, he returned to Bialystok. Sandomierski got his chance for Jagiellonia after Rafał Gikiewicz suffered a poor run of form. During his time at Jagiellonia, for six matches in a row, Sandomierski kept a clean sheet. His streak lasted 564 minutes, a club record, and ended in a clash with Ruch Chorzów.

Genk
In August 2011, Sandomierski signed a five-year contract with Belgian champions K.R.C. Genk, as a replacement for Thibaut Courtois.

Blackburn Rovers

On 31 August 2012, Sandomierski signed on a season long loan with Blackburn Rovers with a view to signing long-term.

He made his debut for Rovers against Cardiff City in a 3–0 defeat conceding two goals one of which was a penalty, coming on for injured counterpart Jake Kean in the 52nd minute. Sandomierski's second appearance came against Sheffield Wednesday after it was announced that Kean would miss the remainder of the season through injury. Caretaker manager Gary Bowyer expressed his faith in the Polish international, however Rovers were beaten 3–2 on the day. His next match saw him gain two impressive clean sheets against Derby County and Huddersfield Town. He then conceded four goals against Watford in a not so impressive match. In his next match against Millwall he only conceded one goal but had a fairly comfortable game.

Honours
Jagiellonia Białystok
Polish Cup: 2009–10
Polish Super Cup: 2010

GNK Dinamo Zagreb
Prva HNL: 2013–14

Zawisza Bydgoszcz
Polish Super Cup: 2014

CFR Cluj
Liga I: 2019–20, 2020–21
Supercupa României: 2020

References

External links
  
 Sandomierski on jagiellonia.neostrada.pl  
 

1989 births
Living people
Sportspeople from Białystok
Polish footballers
Association football goalkeepers
Poland youth international footballers
Poland under-21 international footballers
Poland international footballers
UEFA Euro 2012 players
Jagiellonia Białystok players
Lech Poznań II players
Lech Poznań players
Ruch Wysokie Mazowieckie players
Zawisza Bydgoszcz players
MKS Cracovia (football) players
K.R.C. Genk players
Blackburn Rovers F.C. players
GNK Dinamo Zagreb players
CFR Cluj players
Górnik Zabrze players
Levadiakos F.C. players
Ekstraklasa players
II liga players
III liga players
IV liga players
English Football League players
Croatian Football League players
Liga I players
Polish expatriate footballers
Polish expatriate sportspeople in Belgium
Expatriate footballers in Belgium
Polish expatriate sportspeople in England
Expatriate footballers in England
Polish expatriate sportspeople in Croatia
Expatriate footballers in Croatia
Polish expatriate sportspeople in Romania
Expatriate footballers in Romania
Polish expatriate sportspeople in Greece
Expatriate footballers in Greece